The following human polls make up the 2022 NCAA Division I women's softball rankings.  The NFCA/USA Today Poll is voted on by a panel of 32 Division I softball coaches. The NFCA/USA Today poll, the Softball America poll, the ESPN.com/USA Softball Collegiate rankings, and D1Softball rank the top 25 teams nationally.

Legend

NFCA/USA Today

ESPN.com/USA Softball Collegiate Top 25

D1Softball

Softball America

Source:

References

Rankings
College softball rankings in the United States